Subroto Bagchi (born 31 May 1959) is an Indian entrepreneur and business leader. He is the co-founder of Mindtree, an Indian technology MNC. He has autobiographed his life story in his book Go Kiss the World.

Early life and education
Bagchi was born to Makhan Gopal Bagchi and Labonya Prova Bagchi in Patnagarh, Odisha, where his father was a junior government servant. He studied Political Science at Utkal University. In 1974, he underwent training with the Parachute Regiment of the Indian Army and successfully completed the 5 mandatory jumps to earn the "Para Wings". In 1975, he was adjudged the Best NCC Cadet of India at the Republic Day Parade in Delhi where he was awarded the Prime Minister's Cane Honor.

Professional career
He started his work life as a clerk in the Industries Department of the Government of Odisha in 1976 after giving up his post graduate studies. After a year of working there, he qualified to be a management trainee in DCM in 1977 where he worked for the ensuing 5 years. In 1981, he entered the computer industry and worked for a number of computer companies between 1981 and 1999 in various functions like sales, marketing and operations. His longest stint was at Wipro where he became the Chief Executive of Wipro's Global R&D before working for chairman Azim Premji as corporate Vice-President, Mission Quality. He left Wipro in 1998 to join Lucent Technologies. He left Lucent a year after to co-found Mindtree in 1999 along with 9 other co-founders. Mindtree is a $1 billion (Fiscal 19), Global IT services company with approximately 20000+ people. It is listed at the National Stock Exchange and the Bombay Stock Exchange in India.

When Mindtree started, Subroto Bagchi began as chief operating officer. Soon after, the company was hit by a global economic slowdown and then the events of 9/11 took place. Many early-stage companies collapsed during this time and Bagchi moved to the US in response and helped the leadership team stay together through the difficult years.

Between 1999 and 2007, he was instrumental in articulating Mindtree's mission, vision and values. He led leadership development, marketing and knowledge management initiatives that differentiated the company from the beginning. Mindtree's distinctive physical locations reflect his thought leadership. He is also the face of the company's outreach beyond business.  In 2007, he was part of the apex team that led Mindtree from an idea to IPO. Post-IPO, Bagchi took on the role of Gardener at Mindtree. In this new role, he focused full-time on the Top-100 leaders at Mindtree to expand their leadership capacity beyond the founding team. In 2010, he was appointed vice-chairman to the Board. On 1 April 2012, he assumed the office of chairman. He stepped down as the chairman in January 2016. On May 1, 2016, at the invitation of the Chief Minister of Odisha, he took on the full-time role of Chairman, Odisha Skill Development Authority in the rank and status of a Cabinet Minister at an annual salary of 1 rupees.

Subroto is also on the Board of White Swan Foundation.  White Swan Foundation for Mental Health is a not-for-profit organization that offers knowledge services in the area of mental health. The Foundation provide patients, caregivers and others with well-researched content that will help them make informed decisions on how to deal with mental health issues.

Bibliography

References

External links

Official Mindtree page

Businesspeople from Bangalore
Indian business writers
Living people
1957 births
Businesspeople from Odisha
Utkal University alumni
Writers from Bangalore